Paul Léo Maurice Johnson (born 17 January 1929) was a Progressive Conservative party member of the House of Commons of Canada. He was a lawyer by career.

Maurice Johnson was first elected at the Chambly—Rouville riding in the 1958 general election and was a government member in John Diefenbaker's administration. He was defeated after one term of office by Bernard Pilon of the Liberal party in the 1962 election.

Johnson voted against his government on a measure which limited capital punishment to cases of intentional or premeditated murder. Previously, the death penalty could apply to all forms of murder convictions. These revisions to the Criminal Code concerned Johnson who felt that this decision would lead to elimination of the death penalty.

He is a brother of former Quebec premier Daniel Johnson, Sr.

References

External links
 

1929 births
Living people
Members of the House of Commons of Canada from Quebec
Progressive Conservative Party of Canada MPs
Lawyers in Quebec